Fort Loudoun (or Fort Loudon, after the modern spelling of the town) was a fort in colonial Pennsylvania, one of several forts in colonial America named after John Campbell, 4th Earl of Loudoun. The fort was built in 1756 during the French and Indian War by the Second Battalion of the Pennsylvania Regiment under Colonel John Armstrong, and served as a post on the Forbes Road during the Forbes expedition that successfully drove the French away from Fort Duquesne.

In 1765, following Pontiac's Rebellion, settlers upset with the resumption of trade with Native Americans forced the British garrison to evacuate the fort, part of an uprising known as the Black Boys Rebellion.

A replica of the fort was built on the original site in 1993.

Sources
  Chapter III, Indian War, pp. 159–175

External links
Fort Loudoun website

Loudoun
Loudoun
Loudoun
Buildings and structures in Franklin County, Pennsylvania
Pontiac's War
Government buildings completed in 1756
History of Franklin County, Pennsylvania
Parks in Franklin County, Pennsylvania